Wigo or WIGO may refer to:

 Wolf Wigo, American water polo player
 Wigo, Bishop of Brandenburg, 992 – 1018
 Toyota Agya, a city car known as the Toyota Wigo in the Philippines, Sri Lanka and Brunei market.
 WIGO (AM), a radio station at 1570 AM licensed to Morrow, Georgia
 WIGO-FM, a radio station at 104.9 FM licensed to White Stone, Virginia

See also
 Wiggo (disambiguation)
 Vigo (disambiguation)